Marina Schnider (born 11 July 1986) is a Swiss sport shooter.

She participated at the 2018 ISSF World Shooting Championships, winning a medal.

References

External links

Living people
1986 births
Swiss female sport shooters
ISSF rifle shooters
European Games competitors for Switzerland
Shooters at the 2015 European Games
21st-century Swiss women